MUFL may refer to:

Florida Airport (Cuba)
Mandalay University of Foreign Languages